The Château de Brax is a castle in the commune of Brax in the Haute-Garonne département of France. Originally constructed in the 13th century, there were alterations and additions in the 16th and 18th centuries.

Description 
The structure is enclosed by four circular towers. The rear façade incorporates the grand staircase. The brick walls are crenellated. The front opens onto parkland; access is by a double staircase. A round walk carried on machicolations formed of brick corbels and blind arcades circles the whole building.

Privately owned, it has been listed since 1946 as a monument historique by the French Ministry of Culture.

See also 
 List of castles in France

References

External links 
 

Castles in Haute-Garonne
Monuments historiques of Haute-Garonne